Super Brawl may refer to:

 Nickelodeon Super Brawl, a series of Nickelodeon games
 SuperBrawl, a professional wrestling event held from 1991–2001
 WCW SuperBrawl Wrestling, a video game based on the event